Alcona Dam is a hydro-electric dam on the Au Sable River in Michigan.

Background
This hydro-electric dam is capable of producing 8,000 kilowatts. It is currently named after the county where it is located, but was originally named for a nearby road called Bamfield. Work began on Bamfield Dam in 1917, but the project stalled due to unstable sand and World War I. Construction resumed in 1923, and Alcona Hydro began commercial operation in 1924.

References

Energy infrastructure completed in 1924
Hydroelectric power plants in Michigan
Dams in Michigan
Buildings and structures in Alcona County, Michigan
Consumers Energy dams
Dams completed in 1924
1924 establishments in Michigan